All Hallows Parish, Maryland may refer to:

 All Hallows Parish, South River, Anne Arundel County, Maryland: All Hallows Church, South River
 All Hallows Parish, Snow Hill, Worcester County, Maryland: All Hallows Episcopal Church